The Toronto International Film Festival International Critics' Prizes, currently known as the FIPRESCI Prizes, are film awards presented by the International Federation of Film Critics (FIPRESCI) to films screening at the Toronto International Film Festival.

History
First presented in 1982 as the CFTO International Critics' Prize, the award was voted by all media attending the festival, and could be presented annually to one film, two films or one film with an honorable mention. In 1992, FIPRESCI launched an award at the festival to honour the best film by a first-time director, as selected by an appointed jury of eight international film critics, while the original International Critics' Prize was renamed the Metro Media Award, and continued to be voted on by all accredited media who were not on the FIPRESCI jury.

The Metro Media Award was discontinued after 1998, and replaced with the Discovery Award, which continued to be voted on by all accredited media. In 2008, the awards were modified to their current structure, with two FIPRESCI awards presented for films in the festival's Discovery and Special Presentations streams; a media-voted Discovery award was still presented that year alongside the FIPRESCI Discovery award, but was discontinued thereafter.

Since 2020, only a single FIPRESCI Prize winner has been named each year.

Winners

International Critics' Prize

Metro Media Award

Discovery Award

FIPRESCI Prize

References

International Critics